Cerastium sylvaticum is a species of flowering plant belonging to the family Caryophyllaceae.

Its native range is Europe to Turkey.

References

sylvaticum